Beamable Inc. is a technology company based in Boston, Massachusetts. They currently provide implemention services of Games as a Service features within the Unity game engine. Before filing for bankruptcy in 2020, the company worked within game development.

Background
The company was originally founded in 2010 as a social network game developer. The company created Game of Thrones Ascent, a social and mobile game based on Game of Thrones franchise released on Facebook and web platforms in 2013, followed by iOS and Android devices in 2014. 

In 2014, the company announced a partnership with CBS to create Star Trek Timelines, a strategy roleplaying game featuring characters from Star Trek. 

In 2020, the company filed for Chapter 11 bankruptcy, a process that allows a company to submit a plan to restructure its obligations to creditors with the objective of restoring itself. Court filings reported $3.4 million in liabilities and $637,987 in property assets. Beamable reported in February 2021 that its plan of reorganization had been confirmed by the Worcester court.

In February 2021, Beamable was funded with $5 million for a new Unity-based platform.

References

External links
 Beamable Official website
Beamable LinkedIn Page
Jon Radoff LinkedIn Page

2010 establishments in Massachusetts
Companies based in Boston
Video game companies of the United States
Video game development companies
Mobile game companies
Privately held companies based in Massachusetts
Software companies based in Massachusetts
American companies established in 2010
Video game companies established in 2010
Companies that filed for Chapter 11 bankruptcy in 2020